Aglaia penningtoniana is a species of plant in the family Meliaceae. It is endemic to Papua New Guinea.

References

penningtoniana
Endemic flora of Papua New Guinea
Taxonomy articles created by Polbot